Steve Wood (born 25 June 1962) is an Australian business executive former professional tennis player.

Born in Melbourne, Wood played NCAA Division I tennis in the United States while studying business at Louisiana State University, before embarking on a brief professional tennis career. He qualified for the 1987 Australian Open and in his second round match against Paul Annacone held a two set lead, but was beaten in five sets.

Wood was CEO of Tennis Australia from 2005 to 2013.

References

External links
 
 

1962 births
Living people
Australian male tennis players
LSU Tigers tennis players
Tennis players from Melbourne
Australian sports executives and administrators
Tennis executives